Abel Estanislao (born May 19, 1995 in Marikina, Philippines) is a Filipino actor and model. He is notable in Teen Gen as Jose Vicente "JV" Cortez and one of three member in 3Logy Band. He is an Argentine-Filipino.

Career
Abel Estanislao started his acting career when he landed the role of Jose Vicente "JV" Cortez in the youth oriented series of GMA Network called Teen Gen where he was paired with Sunyee Maluche, also a newcomer. Since then, he has appeared in a number of television dramas with his home network, GMA7.

It has been said that Estanislao's looks have a resemblance to veteran Filipino actor Ping Medina. Estanislao is the nephew of actor Jay Ilagan, husband of actress Amy Austria; and he is also the distant relative of actors Janno Gibbs and Dexter Doria.

In 2014, Estanislao became a member of musical trio 3logy, along with his Teen Gen co-star and best friend and "older brother" Jeric Gonzales and Jak Roberto. Their first song is the revival of Jolina Magdangal's hit Maybe It's You.

Filmography

Television

Discography
 Maybe It's You (3logy)

Trivia
 Estanislao is an ardent guitar player and was lead guitarist of a jazz band which regularly performed in piano bars around the metro.
 Estanislao is an accomplished athlete and was captain of his high school swim team. He is also a 'Judoka' who had annually won the National Judo Championship since he started competing at age 7. He is now training to become a triathlete.

See also
 Jak Roberto
 Jeric Gonzales

References

1995 births
Living people
People from Marikina
Male actors from Metro Manila
21st-century Filipino male singers
Filipino male models
Filipino guitarists
GMA Network personalities